Watter may refer to:

 Watter (band), an American experimental music ensemble
 Watter (Twiste), a river in Hesse, Germany
 Oskar von Watter (1861–1939), German general in WWI
 Tim Watter (born 1991), Swiss Olympic snowboarder
 Watter tomb from 16th?? century in Church of St. Crux, York

See also
 Watters (disambiguation)